Ingeborg Løvnes (born 5 September 1992) is a Norwegian athlete specialising in the 3000 metres steeplechase.

She is a daughter of middle-distance runner Kirsti Voldnes. In 2016, Ingeborg Løvnes won her first national championship, equalling her mother who also took one title.

International competitions

Personal bests
Outdoor
800 metres – 2:08.89 (Mannheim 2009)
1000 metres – 2:48.44 (Oslo 2012)
1500 metres – 4:17.40 (Ninove 2013)
3000 metres – 9:29.37 (Gothenburg 2014)
3000 metres steeplechase – 9:43.97 (Turku 2016)

Indoor
800 metres – 2:12.52 (Haugesund 2013)
1500 metres – 4:24.14 (Växjö 2013)
3000 metres – 9:32.88 (Fayetteville 2016)

References

All-Athletics profile

1992 births
Living people
People from Fet
Norwegian female middle-distance runners
Norwegian female steeplechase runners
Athletes (track and field) at the 2016 Summer Olympics
Olympic athletes of Norway
Sportspeople from Viken (county)
20th-century Norwegian women
21st-century Norwegian women